Trnaniḱ is a village in the municipality of Debar, North Macedonia.

Demographics

The 1971 Yugoslav census was the last to record any people as residing in the village which contained 45 inhabitants, all Albanians. According to the 2002 census, the village had 0 inhabitants.

References

External links

Villages in Debar Municipality
Albanian communities in North Macedonia